BAM! Entertainment, Inc. (formerly Bay Area Multimedia, Inc.) was an American video game publisher based in San Jose, California, that was founded by Ray Musci in October 1999. BAM!'s partnership with Cartoon Network in 2000 led to the development of a number of licensed video games featuring Cartoon Network IPs, including The Powerpuff Girls, Dexter's Laboratory, Samurai Jack, and Ed, Edd n Eddy.

A 2001 distribution deal allowed French publisher Ubi Soft to distribute BAM!'s games internationally. BAM! suffered financial turmoil beginning in 2002, during which time the NASDAQ threatened to delist it from the stock exchange. The company sold off their London-based development studio to VIS Entertainment in 2003. BAM! acquired VIS in 2004 but was delisted from the NASDAQ. The company continued to published licensed games until 2005, when the company went defunct after filing for bankruptcy.

History 
American entrepreneur Ray Musci founded Bay Area Multimedia on October 7, 1999. In December the following year, the company was renamed BAM! Entertainment.

In 2000, BAM! entered a partnership with Cartoon Network, which would allow the company to release games based on Dexter's Laboratory and The Powerpuff Girls. The Cartoon Network partnership expanded to include Samurai Jack and Ed, Edd n Eddy in 2002.

In February 2001, BAM! Entertainment Limited, the British subsidiary of BAM! Entertainment, entered into a distribution deal with French publisher Ubi Soft which would allow them to distribute BAM!'s games in the entirety of Europe except for the United Kingdom.

In 2002, BAM! started to suffer from financial problems, which led to the NASDAQ threatening to delist the company.

In April 2003, the company's London-based development studio was purchased by VIS Entertainment, however, VIS later announced that the studio would close following the completion of its remaining projects. In the same year, following the expiration of their distribution deal with Ubi Soft, BAM! entered into a new distribution deal with Acclaim Entertainment in August. Unlike the Ubi Soft partnership, the Acclaim deal included all PAL region countries. The deal ended after Acclaim's bankruptcy the following year.

In 2004, BAM! acquired VIS Entertainment and fellow subsidiary State of Emergency Development. The NASDAQ finally delisted BAM!'s stock in the same year. VIS Entertainment was placed into bankruptcy in April 2005; BAM! then sold the rights to VIS's State of Emergency 2 to DC Studios in May that year and filed for bankruptcy shortly thereafter.

Games

References

External links 
 

1999 establishments in California
2005 disestablishments in the United States
Companies disestablished in 2005
Companies formerly listed on the Nasdaq
Defunct video game companies of the United States
Video game companies established in 1999
Video game publishers